Conrad Hendricks (Rust-ter-Vaal, 5 February 1979 – Alberton, 14 January 2006) was a South African association football player last playing as goalkeeper for Moroka Swallows.

Although mainly an understudy to Nigerian international Greg Etafia at Swallows, the 26-year-old Hendricks played a key role in the Birds winning the ABSA Cup in 2004 and always performed with distinction when called upon.

He previously played for Kaizer Chiefs, Vaal Ambassadors, Black Leopards.
 
He died in a motor accident in Alberton on the outskirts of Johannesburg.

1979 births
2006 deaths
South African soccer players
Road incident deaths in South Africa
Association football goalkeepers
Moroka Swallows F.C. players
Cape Coloureds
Black Leopards F.C. players